Azy (pronounced AY-zee), is a male hybrid orangutan. He was born on December 14, 1977 at the National Zoo in Washington, D.C. He was transferred to the Albuquerque Zoo in 1978, and returned to the National Zoo in 1980.

In 1995, Azy began living at the Think Tank building and participating in the Zoo's Orangutan Language Project with Rob Shumaker. On September 28, 2004, Azy was moved to the Great Ape Trust of Iowa.

In 2010, he was moved to the Indianapolis Zoo where he resides with five other orangutans from the Great Ape Trust, where Shumaker serves as President of Indianapolis Zoo.

References

External links

Individual orangutans
Apes from language studies
Ape Cognition and Conservation Initiative
1977 animal births
Indianapolis